The rhomboid muscles, often simply called the rhomboids, are rhombus-shaped muscles associated with the scapula. There are two rhomboid muscles on each side of the upper back:

 Rhomboid major muscle
 Rhomboid minor muscle

The large rhombus-shaped muscle, located under the trapezius muscle in the upper part of the thoracic region of the back, and the small muscle, in the same way, participate in the movement of the scapula. Their functions are the following:

 Drawing scapula superomedially
 Supporting scapula
 Rotating glenoid cavity inferiorly
Both muscles are innervated by the dorsal scapular nerve, a branch of the brachial plexus.

Additional images
 ...

References 

Muscles of the torso